BJ Miller is an American physician, author, and speaker. He is a practicing hospice and palliative medicine physician and is best known for his 2015 TED Talk, "What Really Matters at the End of Life" BJ has been on the teaching faculty at UCSF School of Medicine since 2007. He sees patients and caregivers through his online palliative care service, Mettle Health. 

In film, Miller is the subject of Netflix's Academy Award-nominated short documentary, End Game by veteran directors Rob Epstein, Jeffrey Friedman and executive produced by physician and film producer, Shoshana R. Ungerleider. His book for approaching the end of life, A Beginner’s Guide to the End, was co-authored with Shoshana Berger and published in 2019. Miller has a chapter giving advice in Tim Ferriss' book Tools of Titans.

Past positions: BJ formerly served as Executive Director of San Francisco’s Zen Hospice Project, now the Zen Caregiving Project

Personal life
Miller is a triple amputee, a result of climbing on top of a parked train, his watch arching to the power overhead, and getting electrocuted in 1990 when he was a student at Princeton.

References

External links
 

Physicians from Illinois
Writers from Chicago
1971 births
Living people
University of California, San Francisco alumni
UCSF School of Medicine faculty